Los caballeros las prefieren brutas is a Colombian dramedy created and produced by Laberinto Producciones, and Sony Pictures Television for Sony Entertainment Television, and Caracol Televisión. The series is based on the Best-selling novel of the same name by the writer Isabella Santodomingo. The first season composed of 22 episodes premiered worldwide, except for Colombia on 22 February 2010, and concluded on 26 July 2010. While the second season consisting of 40 episodes premiered on 13 October 2011. It stars Colombian actress Valerie Domínguez, and Juan Pablo Raba.

In Colombia, the series premiered on 20 July  2010 on Caracol Televisión, and concluded in general on 6 January 2012. During its first season in Colombia, the series averaged a rating of 11.8. While the second season averaged only 5.8 ratings during its broadcast.

The series revolves around Cristina Oviedo (Valerie Domínguez), a beautiful young woman, who is about to get married, but upon discovering the infidelity of her promised future, decides to throw him out of his house and in his desperate search to find someone to help her with the cats in the apartment, say rent a room to Alejandro Botero (Juan Pablo Raba), a man who appears to be gay before society; but that really is just an excuse to get rid of women, but when you meet Cristina, your way of thinking changes.

Cast

Main 
 Valerie Domínguez as Cristina Oviedo
 Juan Pablo Raba as Alejandro Botero
 Michelle Manterola as Gracia Oviedo
 Mijail Mulkay as Rodrigo Florez
 Patricia Castañeda as Hannah de la Espriella
 Gustavo Ángel as Miguel Forero
 Patricia Bermúdez as Roberta Acevedo

Recurring 
 Ángela Vergara as Pamela Davila
 Juan Pablo Espinosa as Eduardo Santodomingo
 Carolina Acevedo as Martina
 Bárbara Perea as Nelsy
 Luigi Aycardi as Armando Villalba
 Valentina Acosta as Luna
 Arap Bethke as Manuel Carmona
 Luciano D'Alessandro as Ricaldo Altunez
 Majida Issa as Lili
 Sebastián Martínez as Kenny Paulsen
 Héctor de Malba as Leandro
 Roberto Manrique as Daniel
 Santiago Rodríguez as René Campiña

References

External links 
 

2010s Colombian television series
2012 Colombian television series endings
Spanish-language television shows
Caracol Televisión original programming
Sony Entertainment Television original programming
2010 Colombian television series debuts
Colombian television series
Colombian LGBT-related television shows
Sony Pictures Television telenovelas